Ian James Sarson (born 15 March 1963) is a British businessman, and the former managing director of Compass Group UK & Ireland.

Education
He went to Crewe County Grammar School, two years below Mark Price the managing director of Waitrose, from 1974 to 1979. From 1979 to 1981 he did an OND in Hotel and Catering Management at South Cheshire College in Crewe.

He studied Hotel and Catering at Hollings College (now the Hollings Campus of Manchester Metropolitan University, off the A6010) in Manchester from 1981 to 1984.
He completed a MSc in Coaching and Mentoring in March 2020.

Career
He worked at the French company Sodexo, a main competitor of Compass Group. He joined Compass in 2004. Compass Group is based next to Chertsey railway station, off the A317 road. He became managing director of the UK arm in April 2010. He was replaced in this role by Dennis Hogan.

He subsequently became Compass's director for healthcare in Europe and Japan and managing director for Northern Europe. Compass Group is the world's leading foodservice company. He left Compass Group PLC in April 2017 and Established Empower U Coaching.

He was awarded an honorary doctorate by Sheffield Hallam University in 2011 and was made an Honorary Doctor of Letters (DLitt)by the University of West London in 2014.

His is currently chairman of The Sheffield Business School Advisory Board  and a Trustee of the Benevolent Charity Hospitality Action.

Personal Life
He is married with two daughters. He lives in the Basingstoke and Deane district of Hampshire.

References

1963 births
Alumni of Manchester Metropolitan University
Businesspeople in the hospitality industry
Compass Group people
People from Crewe
People from Basingstoke and Deane
Living people
People educated at Ruskin High School, Crewe